Pierre-Yves André (born 14 May 1974 in Lannion, Côtes-d'Armor) is a French former professional footballer who played as a forward. He spent most of his career playing for Bastia, and retired after the club suffered relegation to the French third tier following the 2009–10 season. While at Nantes he won the 2001 Trophée des Champions.

In 2003, André had a six-month loan spell at the English club Bolton Wanderers and successfully helped the side stave off relegation.

References

External links 

Living people
1974 births
People from Lannion
Sportspeople from Côtes-d'Armor
French footballers
Association football forwards
France under-21 international footballers
Ligue 1 players
Ligue 2 players
Premier League players
Stade Rennais F.C. players
SC Bastia players
FC Nantes players
Bolton Wanderers F.C. players
En Avant Guingamp players
French expatriate footballers
French expatriate sportspeople in England
Expatriate footballers in England
Footballers from Brittany
Brittany international footballers